Charles Samuel Everett (17 June 1901 – 10 October 1970) was an Australian cricketer who played first-class cricket for New South Wales from 1921 to 1930.

Everett was born in Sydney and educated at Newington College (1917–1918). A right-arm fast medium bowler and left-handed batsman for Petersham Cricket Club, Everett took 134 wickets at first-class level at an average of 27.11 runs per wicket. He was chosen as part of the Australian squad to tour in England in 1926 but illness and poor form meant he missed selection for the Test matches.

His best bowling figures, 6/23, were taken against Queensland in January 1930; in the same match Donald Bradman scored his then-record 452.

See also
 List of New South Wales representative cricketers

Notes

References

1901 births
1970 deaths
People educated at Newington College
New South Wales cricketers
Australian cricketers